Iridomyrmex viridiaeneus is a species of ant in the genus Iridomyrmex. Described by Viehmeyer in 1914, the species is among the most widespread species in Australia of the genus.

References

Iridomyrmex
Hymenoptera of Australia
Insects described in 1914